Christ 0 is the fifth full-length studio album by the German progressive metal band Vanden Plas, released on March 31, 2006 by InsideOut Music. This concept album interprets the Alexandre Dumas 1844 novel The Count of Monte Cristo, exploring the story of a man imprisoned for a crime he didn't commit and following his chain of vengeful murders through the eyes of "X," an Interpol detective assigned to the case. Throughout the course of the album, both characters come to terms with their goals; X realizes just how similar the nature of his work is to Christ-0's, while 0 repents for the sins of his vengeance and commits suicide. The lyrics make several contemporary references, alluding to modern movies (e.g. Silence of the Lambs) and organizations (Interpol).

The band employed a forty-piece choir for the first time in this album. Lead vocalist Andy Kuntz stated that such orchestral elements were new to Vanden Plas and attributes this experimentation with the four-year wait since their previous album, Beyond Daylight.

Track listing

Bonus track

The first copies of Christ 0 contained a bonus track, Gethsemane. This track is a cover of a song from Jesus Christ Superstar of the same name.

Musicians
Andy Kuntz – Vocals
Stephan Lill – Guitars
Günter Werno – Keyboards
Torsten Reichert – Bass
Andreas Lill – Drums

Personnel
Thomas Ewerhard – Artwork
Markus Teske – Producer, Mastering, Mixing
Vanden Plas – Arranger, Producer
Stefanie Veenstra – Photography

References 

Vanden Plas (band) albums
2006 albums
Concept albums
Inside Out Music albums
Music based on novels
Works based on The Count of Monte Cristo